June 29 - Eastern Orthodox Church calendar - July 1

All fixed commemorations below celebrated on July 13 by Orthodox Churches on the Old Calendar.

For June 30th, Orthodox Churches on the Old Calendar commemorate the Saints listed on June 17.

Saints
 Synaxis of the Holy, Glorious, and All-Praised Twelve Apostles:
 Peter, Andrew, James and John the sons of Zebedee, Philip, Bartholomew, Thomas, Matthew, James the son of Alphaeus, Jude the brother of James, Simon the Zealot, and Matthias.
 Saint Mary of Jerusalem, mother of Apostle Mark (1st century)  (see also: June 29)
 Saint Phygellus, Bishop of Ephesus, of the Seventy Apostles.
 Martyr Basilides the Soldier, at Alexandria (202)
 Martyr Meliton, by the sword.
 Martyr Peter of Sinope, dragged to death.
 Saint Dinara, Queen of Khereti, Georgia (10th century)

Pre-Schism Western saints
 Protomartyrs of Rome, falsely charged by Nero with burning down the city and were ordered to undergo various cruel deaths (64)
 Martyrs Gaius the Priest and Leo the Subdeacon, either in North Africa or in Rome.
 Saint Lucina, an early martyr in Rome.
 Virgin-Martyr Emiliana, in Rome.
 Saint Martial, first Bishop of Limoges and "Apostle of the Limousin", together with two of his priests, Alpinian and Austriclinian (3rd century)
 Saint Eurgain, foundress of Cor-Eurgain in Wales, later called Llantwit (6th century)
 Saint Bertrand, Bishop of Le Mans (623)
 Saint Clotsindis (Clotsend), foundress of Marchiennes Abbey (c. 635-714)
 Saint Erentrude, Abbess of Nonnberg Monastery, Salzburg (c. 718)
 Saint Marcian, Bishop of Pampeluna in Spain, he was present at the Sixth Council of Toledo in 737 (c. 757)
 Saint Ostianus, a saint venerated at Viviers in France.

Post-Schism Orthodox saints
 Saint George of the Holy Mountain and Georgia (1065)  (see also: June 27 )
 Saint Andrew, Prince of Bogoliubovo (1174)
 Saint Peter, Prince of the Tatar Horde, Wonderworker of Rostov (1290) 
 Saint Gelasius of Rimet in Transylvania (14th century)
 Saint Parasceve of Kevrolsk (near Arkhangelsk), sister of Artemius of Verkola (16th century)
 Saint Stephen of Omsk (1877)

New martyrs and confessors
 New Martyr Michael Paknanas the Gardener, of Athens (1770)
 New Hieromartyr Timothy Petropavlovsk, Priest (1918) 
 New Hieromartyr Nicandor (Prusak), Hieromonk of Tolga Monastery, Yaroslavl (1918) 
 New Hieromartyr Theogenes (Kozyrev), Archimandrite, of Chimkent, Kazakhstan (1939) 
 New Hieromartyr Milan Popovic, Priest, of Rmanj Monastery, by the Ustashas (1941)
 New Martyr Alexander (Schmorell) of Munich (1943)
 New Martyr John Demidov (1944)

Other commemorations
 Icon of the Mother of God of Balikin (1711)
 Icon of the Mother of God of Gorbanevsk (1786)
 Repose of Bishop Nestor (Zass) of the Aleutians and Alaska (1882)
 Commemoration of the Slaughtered Christians at Diyarbekir of Asia Minor under the Turks and Kurds (1895)
 Glorification (1918) of Saint Sophronius, Bishop of Irkutsk (1771)
 Repose of Archimandrite Gervasios (Paraskevopoulos) of Patras (1964)

Icon gallery

Notes

References

Sources
 June 30/July 13. Orthodox Calendar (PRAVOSLAVIE.RU).
 July 13 / June 30. HOLY TRINITY RUSSIAN ORTHODOX CHURCH (A parish of the Patriarchate of Moscow).
 June 30. OCA - The Lives of the Saints.
 June 30. The Year of Our Salvation - Holy Transfiguration Monastery, Brookline, Massachusetts. 
 The Autonomous Orthodox Metropolia of Western Europe and the Americas (ROCOR). St. Hilarion Calendar of Saints for the year of our Lord 2004. St. Hilarion Press (Austin, TX). p. 48.
 The Thirtieth Day of the Month of June. Orthodoxy in China.
 June 30. Latin Saints of the Orthodox Patriarchate of Rome.
 The Roman Martyrology. Transl. by the Archbishop of Baltimore. Last Edition, According to the Copy Printed at Rome in 1914. Revised Edition, with the Imprimatur of His Eminence Cardinal Gibbons. Baltimore: John Murphy Company, 1916. pp. 189–190.
 Rev. Richard Stanton. A Menology of England and Wales, or, Brief Memorials of the Ancient British and English Saints Arranged According to the Calendar, Together with the Martyrs of the 16th and 17th Centuries. London: Burns & Oates, 1892. pp. 294–296.
Greek Sources
 Great Synaxaristes:  30 ΙΟΥΝΙΟΥ. ΜΕΓΑΣ ΣΥΝΑΞΑΡΙΣΤΗΣ.
  Συναξαριστής. 30 Ιουνίου. ECCLESIA.GR. (H ΕΚΚΛΗΣΙΑ ΤΗΣ ΕΛΛΑΔΟΣ). 
  30 Ιουνίου. Αποστολική Διακονία της Εκκλησίας της Ελλάδος (Apostoliki Diakonia of the Church of Greece).
  30/06/2018. Ορθόδοξος Συναξαριστής. 
Russian Sources
  13 июля (30 июня). Православная Энциклопедия под редакцией Патриарха Московского и всея Руси Кирилла (электронная версия). (Orthodox Encyclopedia - Pravenc.ru).
  30 июня по старому стилю / 13 июля по новому стилю. Русская Православная Церковь - Православный церковный календарь на 2017 год.
  30 июня (ст.ст.) 13 июля 2014 (нов. ст.). Русская Православная Церковь Отдел внешних церковных связей. (DECR).

June in the Eastern Orthodox calendar